Esther Rochon (née Blackburn) (born 27 June 1948) is a Canadian science fiction writer.

Born in Quebec City, Quebec, the daughter of screenwriter Marthe Blackburn and composer Maurice Blackburn, at the age of 16 she won the Governor General First Prize for a short story in the Young Author's contest of Radio Canada. Rochon studied Mathematics at the Université de Montréal.

She has won the Quebec Science Fiction Fantasy Grand Prix four times.

Selected bibliography
En hommage aux araignées — 1974
L'épuisement du soleil — 1985
Coquillage — 1987 (translated as The Shell, 1990)
L'espace du diamant — 1991

References

 W. H. New, ed. Encyclopedia of LIterature in Canada. Toronto: University of Toronto Press, 2002: 983.

External links

 Alire

1948 births
Living people
Canadian novelists in French
Canadian science fiction writers
Canadian women novelists
French Quebecers
Women science fiction and fantasy writers
Writers from Quebec City
20th-century Canadian novelists
20th-century Canadian women writers